Cluster algebras are a class of commutative rings introduced by .  A cluster algebra of rank n is an integral domain A, together with some subsets of size n called clusters whose union generates the algebra A and which satisfy various conditions.

Definitions

Suppose that F is an integral domain, such as the field Q(x1,...,xn) of rational functions in n variables over the rational numbers Q.

A cluster of rank n consists of a set of n elements {x, y, ...} of F, usually assumed to be an algebraically independent set of generators of a field extension F.

A seed consists of a cluster {x, y, ...}  of F, together with an exchange matrix  B with integer entries bx,y indexed by pairs of elements x, y of the cluster. The matrix is sometimes assumed to be skew-symmetric, so that bx,y = –by,x for all x and y. More generally the matrix might be skew-symmetrizable, meaning there are positive integers dx associated with the elements of the cluster such that dxbx,y = –dyby,x for all x and y. It is common to picture a seed as a quiver with vertices the generating set, by drawing bx,y arrows from x to y if this number is positive. When bx,y is skew symmetrizable the quiver has no loops or 2-cycles.

A mutation of a seed, depending on a choice of vertex y of the cluster,  is a new seed given by a generalization of tilting as follows. Exchange the values of bx,y and by,x for all x in the cluster. If  bx,y > 0 and by,z > 0  then replace bx,z by  bx,yby,z + bx,z. If  bx,y < 0 and by,z < 0  then replace bx,z by  -bx,yby,z + bx,z. If bx,y by,z ≤ 0 then do not change bx,z. Finally replace y by a new generator w, where 

where the products run through the elements t in the cluster of the seed such that bt,y is positive or negative respectively. The inverse of a mutation is also a mutation, i.e. if A is a mutation of B then B is a mutation of A.

A cluster algebra is constructed from an initial seed as follows. If we repeatedly mutate the seed in all possible ways, we get a finite or infinite graph of seeds, where two seeds are joined by an edge if one can be obtained by mutating the other. The underlying algebra of the cluster algebra is the algebra generated by all the clusters of all the seeds in this graph. The cluster algebra also comes with the extra structure of the seeds of this graph.

A cluster algebra is said to be of finite type if it has only a finite number of seeds.  showed that the cluster algebras of finite type can be classified in terms of the  Dynkin diagrams of finite-dimensional simple Lie algebras.

Examples

Cluster algebras of rank 1

If {x} is the cluster of a seed of rank 1, then the only mutation takes this to {2x−1}. So a cluster algebra of rank 1 is just a ring k[x,x−1] of Laurent polynomials, and it has just two clusters, {x} and {2x−1}. In particular it is of finite type and is associated with the Dynkin diagram A1.

Cluster algebras of rank 2

Suppose that we start with the cluster {x1, x2} and take the exchange matrix with b12 = –b21 = 1. Then mutation gives a sequence of variables x1, x2, x3, x4,... such that the clusters are given by adjacent pairs {xn, xn+1}. The variables are related by 

so are given by the sequence

which repeats with period 5. So this cluster algebra has exactly 5 clusters, and in particular is of finite type. It is associated with the Dynkin diagram A2.

There are similar examples with b12 = 1, –b21 = 2 or 3, where the analogous sequence of cluster variables repeats with period 6 or 8. These are also of finite type, and are associated with the Dynkin diagrams B2 and G2. However if |b12b21| ≥ 4 then the sequence of cluster variables is not periodic and the cluster algebra is of infinite type.

Cluster algebras of rank 3

Suppose we start with the quiver x1 → x2 → x3. Then the 14 clusters are:

 

 

 

There are 6 cluster variables other than the 3 initial ones x1, x2, x3 given by
. 
They correspond to the 6 positive roots of the Dynkin diagram A3: more precisely the denominators are monomials in x1, x2, x3, corresponding to the expression of positive roots as the sum of simple roots. 
The 3+6 cluster variables generate a cluster algebra of finite type, associated with the Dynkin diagram A3.
The 14 clusters are the vertices of the cluster graph, which is an associahedron.

Grassmannians
Simple examples are given by the algebras of homogeneous functions on the Grassmannians. The Plücker coordinates provide some of the distinguished elements.

In that case, the Plücker coordinates provide all the distinguished elements and the clusters can be completely described using triangulations of a regular polygon with n vertices. More precisely, clusters are in one-to-one correspondence with triangulations and the distinguished elements are in one-to-one correspondence with diagonals (line segments joining two vertices of the polygon). One can distinguish between diagonals in the boundary, which belong to every cluster, and diagonals in the interior. This corresponds to a general distinction between coefficient variables and cluster variables.

Cluster algebras arising from surfaces
Suppose S is a compact connected oriented Riemann surface and M is a non-empty finite set of points in S that contains at least one point from each boundary component of S (the boundary of S is not assumed to be either empty or non-empty). The pair (S, M) is often referred to as a bordered surface with marked points. It has been shown by Fomin-Shapiro-Thurston that if S is not a closed surface, or if M has more than one point, then the (tagged) arcs on (S, M) parameterize the set of cluster variables of certain cluster algebra A(S, M), which depends only on (S, M) and the choice of some coefficient system, in such a way that the set of (tagged) triangulations of (S, M) is in one-to-one correspondence with the set of clusters of A(S, M), two (tagged) triangulations being related by a flip if and only if the clusters they correspond to are related by cluster mutation.

Double Bruhat Cells

These are called factorization parameters and their structure is encoded in a wiring diagram. With only  or only , this is Bruhat decomposition.

References

 .

External links
Fomin's Cluster algebra portal
Fomin's papers on cluster algebras

Algebras
Commutative algebra